Ferhat Yazgan (born 20 October 1992) is a German professional footballer who plays for Turkish club Çorum on loan from Iğdır.

Career
Yazgan began his career in his native Germany with Holstein Kiel in 2010, and shortly after had a stint with VfL Wolfsburg II.
He transferred to the Turkish club Trabzonspor, where he had an unassuming stint including a loan to 1461 Trabzon in 2015. In 2016, he moved to Sakaryaspor for 3 years, followed by a stint in Manisa FK for 2 years in semi-pro Turkish leagues. He signed with İstanbulspor on 26 August 2021 in the TFF First League. He helped İstanbulspor achieve promotion in the 2021-22 season for the first time in 17 years. He started in İstanbulspor return to the Süper Lig in a 2–0 season opening loss to Trabzonspor on 5 August 2022.

International career
Born in Germany, Yazgan is of Turkish descent. He was called up to the Turkey U20s in 2012 but did not make an appearance.

References

External links

1992 births
Sportspeople from Kiel
Footballers from Schleswig-Holstein
German people of Turkish descent
Living people
German footballers
Association football midfielders
Holstein Kiel players
Holstein Kiel II players
VfL Wolfsburg II players
Trabzonspor footballers
1461 Trabzon footballers
Sakaryaspor footballers
Manisa FK footballers
İstanbulspor footballers
Regionalliga players
Süper Lig players
TFF First League players
TFF Second League players
TFF Third League players